Trịnh Xuân Thanh (born 13 February 1966 in Hanoi) is a former Vietnamese politician and businessman. He is the former head of the state-owned Petrovietnam Construction Joint Stock Corporation (a subsidiary of Petrovietnam), and the former Deputy-Chairman of the Provincial People's Committee of Hậu Giang. In 2016, he was accused of causing massive losses at the state-owned company and fled the country. While in Berlin, as an asylum-seeker, he was allegedly kidnapped and repatriated to Vietnam on 23 July 2017. This led to diplomatic scandal resulting in Germany to expel a Vietnamese diplomat.

He later announced on Vietnam television that he had decided to turn himself in to Vietnamese authorities. However, there have been suggestions that his statement was possibly made under duress. On 22 January 2018 he was sentenced to life imprisonment.

Early life
Trịnh Xuân Thanh was born 13 February 1966 in Hanoi, Vietnam. He graduated from Hanoi Architectural University in 1990.

Career
Trịnh Xuân Thanh is a former member of the Communist Party of Vietnam.

Thanh began his career in Germany from 1990 to 1995. He later worked for the state-owned company in Vietnam. In 2007, he joined Petrovietnam Construction Joint Stock Corporation (PVC). He served as its Chairman from 2009 to 2013. He was subsequently accused of causing $150m in losses at PVC.

Thanh worked for the Ministry of Industry and Trade in Da Nang in 2013. He later served as the Deputy-Chairman of the Hậu Giang Provincial People's Committee.

Kidnapping
The Ministry of Public Security issued a statement on 31 July 2017 saying that Thanh had turned himself  to the police following accusations against him of causing massive losses at his previous employer. The Ministry of Public Security issued an international arrest warrant for him in September 2016.  It was not known where Trịnh Xuân Thanh has been hiding since he left Vietnam. It is also not clear exactly how or when Thanh returned to Vietnam.

On hearing of Thanh's reappearance in Vietnam, the editor of the Vietnamese online newspaper, Thoibao.de in Germany, Mr Lê Trung Khoa, contacted Thanh's lawyer, the police and the state prosecutor in Berlin. He then announced in a video conference with the BBC News on the same day that Thanh was abducted at about 10:40 on 23 July in Tiergarten park in Berlin with a female employee of Vietnam’s foreign trade office, allegedly by armed men from Vietnam's secret service and bundled into the back of a car.

The next day, the first of August, the German newspaper TAZ gave further details: Thanh had previously sought political asylum at the beginning of 1990s but had returned voluntarily to Vietnam in 1995, and, despite the fact that there was an international arrest warrant for him issued in September 2016 by the Ministry of Public Security of Vietnam, he was not pursued because the claim "violating Vietnamese law" was not considered concrete enough.

A day later, the German foreign ministry confirmed the kidnapping, blaming the Vietnamese intelligence service and the Vietnamese Embassy in Germany, for what it called "an unprecedented and glaring breach of German and international law". In response, they ordered a Vietnamese intelligence officer from the Vietnamese Embassy in Berlin to leave Germany within 48 hours and demanded that Thanh be allowed to return immediately to allow the Vietnamese authorities to apply for his extradition and to allow his application for asylum to be examined. Germany also said it was considering other measures against Vietnam.

On 3 August 2017, Thanh appeared on Vietnamese television on and said he had returned to Vietnam voluntarily; however, his asylum lawyer suggested he may have said this under duress. Vietnam's Foreign Ministry in a press conference expressed regret over a statement from Germany accusing Vietnam of kidnapping him.

Foreign Minister Sigmar Gabriel said on 4 August, and repeated in an interview with Bärbel Krauss, "I want to say this quite clearly: under no circumstances will we tolerate this kind of thing. Nor will we let it go....But we reserve the right to take further measures if necessary...But obviously we cannot simply go back to business as usual, as if nothing had happened."

Trịnh Xuân Thanh was sentenced in Hanoi on 22 January 2018 to life imprisonment for embezzlement and economic mismanagement.

References

Living people
1960s births
People from Hanoi
Communist Party of Vietnam politicians
Vietnamese businesspeople
Vietnamese criminals